Lieutenant General Kashmir Singh Katoch, MC (15 July 1915 – 25 April 2007) was an Indian Army General and military adviser to the Maharaja Hari Singh of Jammu and Kashmir, officiating as the Chief of Staff of the State Forces during the Indo-Pakistani War of 1947. He later served as the Vice Chief of Army Staff of the Indian Army.

Life and career
Katoch was born in 1915 in Srinagar to Janak Singh, an officer of the Jammu and Kashmir State Forces, later a prime minister of Jammu and Kashmir.

He did his military training at the Indian Military Academy, Dehradun, completing the course in 1936. After commissioning he was attached to the 1st battalion, East Surrey Regiment for a year. He was posted to the 6th battalion Frontier Force Rifles (FFR, now the first Frontier Force Regiment of Pakistan) on 10 August 1937. On 19 April 1942 he was attached to the 10th (training) battalion Frontier Force Rifles and by October 1942 held the rank of Lieutenant, war substantive Captain and temporary Major.

He fought in World War II, commanding the Dogra Company of 6th battalion Frontier Force Rifles. The battalion served in Italy and fought in the Battle of Monte Cassino. When the Pathan company got severely mauled, the Dogra company cleared many of the machine gun nests. Katoch was awarded the Military Cross.

Katoch became a Lieutenant Colonel in the British Indian Army at the age of 31.

Jammu and Kashmir State Forces
After General Henry Lawrence Scott, the Chief of Staff of Kashmir State Forces, decided to relinquish his post in September 1947, the Maharaja requested the Government of India to second an officer to head the State Forces. Kashmir Singh Katoch, then a Colonel, was chosen for the job. However, Katoch felt that he was too junior to serve as the Chief of Staff and advised the Maharaja to appoint a senior officer such as Brigadier Rajinder Singh. Katoch was then appointed as a 'military adviser' to the Maharaja. However, Brigadier Rajinder Singh was killed in action within the first few days of the Pakistani tribal invasion, 

With the accession of the State to the Indian Union on 26–27 October 1947, the State Forces came under the command of the Indian Army. Colonel Katoch officiated as the commanding officer of the State Forces.

Indian Army 
On 18 November 1950, still only 35 years old, Katoch was promoted to acting brigadier and given command of a brigade. He was promoted to colonel on 1 September 1955, and to brigadier on 1 September 1958. He was promoted to major-general on 1 September 1960, and was appointed chairman, Permanent Joint Planning Committee on 4 February 1963.  He was promoted to acting lieutenant-general on 1 May 1963 and appointed the Adjutant General of the Indian Army, with promotion to the substantive rank on 23 November. 

He subsequently commanded the XV Corps in the Kashmir Valley. It was the main force that fought against Pakistan's Operation Gibraltar during the Indo-Pakistani War of 1965.

Later life 
On 8 June 1966, Katoch was appointed Vice Chief of the Army Staff (VCOAS). He retired in 1970, and died on 25 April 2007.

Honours
The Government of India awarded Gen Katoch the third highest civilian honour, the Padma Bhushan, in 1965,

See also 

 Janak Singh
 Hari Singh
 Indian Military Academy

References

Bibliography 
 

1915 births
2007 deaths
British Army personnel of World War II
British Indian Army officers
Indian Army personnel of World War II
Indian civil servants
Indian Military Academy alumni
People from Jammu and Kashmir
People from Srinagar
Indian recipients of the Military Cross
Recipients of the Padma Bhushan in civil service
Generals of the Indo-Pakistani War of 1965
Vice Chiefs of Army Staff (India)
Jammu and Kashmir State Forces
People of the Indo-Pakistani War of 1947